Yehvann Diouf (born 16 November 1999) is a French professional footballer who plays as a goalkeeper for Ligue 1 club Stade de Reims.

Club career
On 8 September 2016, Diouf became the youngest ever player to sign a professional contract with Troyes AC, at the age of 16 years and 297 days. He made his professional debut for Troyes in a 0–0 Ligue 2 tie with AC Ajaccio on 17 May 2019.

Diouf signed a four-year contract to join Stade de Reims starting 1 July 2019.

International career
Born in France, Diouf is of Senegalese descent. Diouf represented the France U19s at the 2018 UEFA European Under-19 Championship.

References

External links

1999 births
Living people
People from Montreuil, Seine-Saint-Denis
French sportspeople of Senegalese descent
French footballers
Association football goalkeepers
France youth international footballers
Ligue 1 players
Ligue 2 players
Championnat National 2 players
Championnat National 3 players
ES Troyes AC players
Stade de Reims players